Alberto Veronesi (Milan, 1965) is an Italian conductor. He is a student of Myung-Whun Chung

Discography
Veronesi began recording operas for Deutsche Grammophon in 2006 working with Plácido Domingo in rarer verismo repertoire such as Puccini’s Edgar and rare Puccini arias and duets, Leoncavallo’s I Medici and La Nuit de mai, and Giordano’s Fedora.  In 2008 he recorded Mascagni's L'amico Fritz with Roberto Alagna and Angela Gheorghiu live in Berlin for Deutsche Grammophon.

References

Italian male conductors (music)
Musicians from Milan
Living people
21st-century Italian conductors (music)
21st-century Italian male musicians
Year of birth missing (living people)